René Baeten (10 June 1927, in Herentals – 5 June 1960, in Stekene) was a Belgian professional motocross racer. He competed in the Motocross World Championships from 1947 to 1960. Baeten is notable for winning the 1958 500cc Motocross World Championship. In 1958, Baeten was named the recipient of the Belgian National Sports Merit Award.

In 1953 and 1954, Baeten finished second in the 500cc European motocross championships to Auguste Mingels. In 1957, the F.I.M. upgraded the competition to world championship status, and again Baeten would finish in second place, this time to Bill Nilsson on an AJS motorcycle. In 1958, Baeten would ride an FN motorcycle to claim the 500cc motocross world championship, defeating Nilsson and Sten Lundin. He was honored for his achievement with the 1958 Belgian National Sports Merit Award. Baeten was killed in a racing accident in 1960.

References 

1927 births
1960 deaths
People from Herentals
Sportspeople from Antwerp Province
Belgian motocross riders
Motorcycle racers who died while racing